Lattie Finch Coor Jr. (born September 26, 1936) is an American academic specialising in public policy and the past president of two universities. He was the 15th President of Arizona State University (1990–2002) and the 21st President of the University of Vermont (1976–1989).

Biography
Lattie Coor was born in Phoenix, Arizona, on September 26, 1936, the son of Lattie Finch Coor Sr. and  Elnora (née Witten) Coor. His father was a prominent local educator who was the teaching Principal of Avondale Elementary School in 1936 and later became the first Superintendent of the Avondale Elementary School District.

Coor graduated from Northern Arizona University in 1958 with a BA in Political Science. He received his MA and PhD from Washington University in St. Louis where his 1964 doctoral dissertation was titled The Increasing Vulnerability of the American Governor. He remained at Washington University for the next ten years as a faculty member and eventually as its Vice Chancellor. He left in 1976 when he became the 21st President of the University of Vermont. He served in that capacity until 1989 and then moved to Arizona State University where he became its 15th President.

After his retirement from the presidency of ASU in 2002 he stayed on as Professor and Ernest W. McFarland Chair in Leadership and Public Policy in the university's School of Public Affairs. In 2002 he also co-founded a "do tank", Center for the Future of Arizona, and serves as Chairman and Founding Director.

Personal life
Coor married Elva Wingfield in 1994. He has two sons and a daughter from his previous marriage to Ina Fitzhenry-Coor.

References

Presidents of Arizona State University
Presidents of the University of Vermont
1936 births
Living people
Washington University in St. Louis alumni
Washington University in St. Louis faculty